Jithan is a 2005 Indian Tamil-language  supernatural romantic thriller film directed by Vincent Selva. The film stars Jithan Ramesh (in his Tamil debut) along with Pooja, Kalabhavan Mani, Livingston, S. Ve. Shekher, and Nalini. R. Sarathkumar plays an extended cameo appearance in the film. The film was produced by Raadan Network, owned by Raadhika. Its score and soundtrack were composed by Srikanth Deva. The film is a remake of Bollywood film, Gayab (2004). The film released on 6 May 2005 to positive reviews and became a surprise hit. The film was produced by Sarathkumar's wife Raadhika.

Plot
Surya, an introvert by nature, loves his classmate Priya from childhood but has never expressed his feelings towards her. Meanwhile, Surya's classmate Ajay also tries to woo Priya, in which he succeeds but to an extent. Priya does not like Surya as she views him as a nerd. One day, Surya gets frustrated as he is not being liked by anyone and cries loudly in a beach, where he finds a small idol of a God. He holds the idol, saying that it is better to be invisible rather than being disliked by everyone.

On returning home, Surya gets shocked knowing that he has really become invisible, while others can't see him but can only hear his voice. Surya's father is worried, as he is missing. Surya understands his father's love and discloses the truth to him alone. Taking advantage of invisibility, he always accompanies Priya without disturbing her. He also plays pranks on Ajay to exhibit his anger. Surya discloses the truth to Priya also following which she gets scared on hearing Surya's voice. Surya decides to rob a bank so that he could get some gifts for Priya, following which he gets media attention.

A special police team led by Tamizharasu and his assistant Singampuli is appointed to trap the invisible man behind the bank robbery. Priya informs the truth about Surya's power to Thamizharasu, and they set an eye on Surya to prevent him from committing further crimes. Despite attempts made by Thamizharasu's team, they are unable to stop Surya. Surya threatens that he will create problems in city if Priya does not love him. Thamizharasu comes up with a plan of using Priya to trap Surya and asks Priya to cooperate with the plan. Thamizharasu wants Priya to bring Surya to a deserted place which is already surrounded by police. Priya should talk pleasingly to Surya and in the meantime, should place her shawl over Surya, so that the police can trap him.

Everything progresses well as per plan. Surya comes to the place to meet Priya. Surya becomes emotional and starts describing his love towards Priya from childhood. He also explains certain events where Priya actually misunderstood him previously. On hearing these, Priya understands Surya to be an innocent and kindhearted person who loves her a lot. Thamizharasu overhears their conversation, understands Surya's good nature, and decides to trap him alive instead of killing. Thamizharasu instructs Priya to put her shawl on Surya, but Priya changes her mind. She informs the truth to Surya and pleads him to run away. Upon knowing the plan, Surya tries to escape, but suddenly it rains whereby revealing his presence because water droplets on Surya make others see it. Despite Thamizharasu's instructions, Singampuli shoots towards Surya, following which he dies. Priya cries seeing Surya's dead body, as she understood his good nature before his death.

Cast

Jithan Ramesh as Surya (voice by Arya)
Pooja as Priya
Kalabhavan Mani as Singampuli
S. Ve. Shekher as Priya's father
Livingston as Surya's father
 Mukesh as Ajay, Priya's fiancé
Nalini as Surya's mother
Thalaivasal Vijay as Politician
Jasper as Henchman
Madhan Bob as Doctor 
R. Sarathkumar as Tamizharasu (extended cameo appearance) 
Mysskin as man at telephone booth (uncredited)

Production 
The film was announced in February 2004, with R. B. Choudary's third son Ramesh signed to make his Tamil debut. 
This is the second film of Radaan Mediaworks. Two songs were shot at Phuket Province.

Soundtrack
The music was composed by Srikanth Deva and released by Star Music.

Release
A reviewer from The Hindu wrote that "As the timid Surya, the new hero Ramesh does a good job. The sad yet powerful eyes convey emotions well. ... Sarath Kumar in a guest role  lends dignity and power to the police officer he portrays". Sify wrote that "But every time you get involved, the script of director Vincent Selva disappears".

Legacy 
After the success of the film, Ramesh appended "Jithan" to his stage name and received further film offers.

References

External links

2005 films
2000s Tamil-language films
Films about invisibility
Tamil remakes of Hindi films
Fictional portrayals of the Tamil Nadu Police
Films scored by Srikanth Deva